OIlentangy, Ohio may refer to:

Olentangy, Crawford County, Ohio
Olentangy West, Columbus, Ohio